Mol Len is a mountain in Southeast Asia. Mol Len is considered to be one the ultra prominent peaks in Southeast Asia.

The mountain rises about 20 km to the southeast of Meluri town, Nagaland.

See also
List of Ultras of Southeast Asia
List of mountains in Burma

References

External links
 "Mol Len, Myanmar/India" on Peakbagger

Mountains of Nagaland
Sagaing Region
Mountains of Myanmar
International mountains of Asia
India–Myanmar border